This is a list of electoral results for the Division of Canberra in Australian federal elections from the division's creation in 1974 until the present.

Members

Election results

Elections in the 2020s

2022

Elections in the 2010s

2019

2016

2013

2010

Elections in the 2000s

2007

2004

2001

Elections in the 1990s

1998

1996

Ros Kelly had won Canberra at the [[Electoral results for the Division of Canberra#1993|1993 election]], however she resigned in 1995 and Brendan Smyth won the seat at the [[Electoral results for the Division of Canberra#1995 by-election|resulting by-election]]. Smyth contested the new seat of Namadgi

1995 by-election

1993

1990

Elections in the 1980s

1987

1984

1983

1980

Elections in the 1970s

1977

1975

1974

References

 Australian Electoral Commission. Federal Election results

Australian federal electoral results by division